Dowsing Point is a residential locality in the local government area (LGA) of Glenorchy in the Hobart LGA region of Tasmania. The 2016 census recorded a population of 85 for the state suburb of Dowsing Point.

It is a locality of the greater area of Hobart.  It is part of the City of Glenorchy and encompasses the area of land north-east of Goodwood protruding into the River Derwent.  It includes the land feature Dowsings Point which marks the north of the entrance to Prince of Wales Bay.

Dowsing Point is best known as the western land-end of the Bowen Bridge (Goodwood Road), an arterial road linking the Brooker Highway with the East Derwent Highway.

While the City of Glenorchy classes it as a suburb, there are only a small number of residences within the area located between the Commonwealth land situating the Derwent Barracks, and the Elwick Racecourse.

Dowsing Point is the site of the Tasmanian Technopark, a Qantas call centre, an army barracks and various park lands.  In 2007, Mayor Adriana Taylor proposed to have Dowsing Point as the new site of the Royal Hobart Hospital.

History 
Dowsing Point is a confirmed locality.

During the Tasman Bridge disaster, Dowsings Point was used as the western side of a Bailey bridge crossing the River Derwent.

Geography
The waters of the River Derwent form the northern, eastern and most of the southern boundaries.

Road infrastructure
Route B35 (Goodwood Road) runs through from west to east.

References

Localities of City of Glenorchy